Dżesika Jaszek (born 4 April 1996) is a Polish footballer who plays as a forward for Czarni Sosnowiec and has appeared for the Poland women's national team. She won the U17 European title with Poland in 2013 as well as numerous domestic trophies.

Career
Jaszek has been capped for the Poland national team, appearing for the team during the 2019 FIFA Women's World Cup qualifying cycle.

International goals

References

External links
 
 
 

1996 births
Living people
Polish women's footballers
Poland women's international footballers
Women's association football forwards
KKS Czarni Sosnowiec players